The Série 1930 are a class of diesel-electric locomotives formerly used by Portuguese Railways (CP). They are visually very similar to the Série 1900 locomotives, but have a higher top speed of 120 km/h. They were assembled in Portugal by Sorefame, under licence from the French company Alsthom and entered service in 1981. The final locomotive in service was withdrawn following failure in October 2018.

They are mainly used on passenger train services. When first introduced, they displaced the Série 1800 locomotives from express passenger trains between Barreiro and the Algarve, but their duties have been reduced since the electrification of the main line between Lisbon and Faro, and now also to Évora.

References

Railway locomotives introduced in 1981
Alstom locomotives
Diesel-electric locomotives of Portugal